Kastus Technologies is an Irish multinational nanotechnology company which specialises in patented visible light activated, photocatalytic, antimicrobial coatings. The coatings prevent the growth of bacteria on the surface it has been applied to, such as ceramics, glass, and touchscreens, with no negative side effects for the end user. Founded in Dublin in 2014, Kastus’ antimicrobial coatings were in development for over 10 years as part of a collaboration with Dublin Institute of Technology and the Advanced Materials and Bio Engineering Research (AMBER) Centres.

History
John Browne, Kastus CEO, founded the company in 2014 in Dublin following 10 years of collaborative research with Dublin Institute of Technology. It was developed out of an increasing demand for a reduction in the spread of  antibiotic-resistant infections commonly found on indoor surfaces. In October 2017, The Department of Health published “Ireland’s National Action Plan on Antimicrobial Resistance 2017-2020”, which highlighted the threat antimicrobial resistance poses and the urgent need for new technology to combat this.

In April 2016 the Sligo Institute of Technology, which is funded by Kastus, announced the creation of a non-toxic antimicrobial nanotechnology, which Kastus plans to market globally. This research is supported by a €1.5 million funding investment from Atlantic Bridge.

In 2018, Kastus partnered with Oman-based ceramic tile producer Al Maha Ceramics, which exports to 15 countries in Asia and Africa. The deal saw Kastus use its antimicrobial technology to produce a range of new tiles called iProtect.

In 2019, Kastus partnered with Faytech to enhance their development of touch display manufacturing capabilities. 

In 2020, Kastus developed antimicrobial and antiviral technology used on touch screens to prevent the spread of diseases such as COVID-19. The screen technology has been shown to kill up to 99% of harmful bacteria, fungi and antibiotic-resistant superbugs, including human coronavirus. Kastus was awarded EU Funding to further develop and expand these technologies and their applications, and has partnered with companies such as Lenovo, Zagg, and Lavazza with a range of commercial applications for their products. 

In 2021, Kastus raised €5.65m in a Series A round to build out its global commercial team to meet growing demand for its antiviral surface protection technology.

Awards
Spin-out Company Impact Award (2017)
Irish Times Innovation of the Year award (2017)
Irish Times Life Sciences and Healthcare award (2017)
KTI Impact Award Winners 2017
Med Tech Award Finalists  2020 
EY Entrepreneur of The Year Finalists

References 

Nanotechnology companies
Companies based in Dublin (city)